Qeshlaq-e Qarah Tappeh Tamaq Ali (also romanized as Qeshlāq-e Qarah Tappeh Tamāq ʿAlī) is a village in Qeshlaq-e Shomali Rural District, in the Central District of Parsabad County, Ardabil Province, Iran. At the 2006 census, its population was 175, in 33 families.

References 

Towns and villages in Parsabad County